Brampton Centennial Secondary School (BCSS) is a public high school located in Brampton, Ontario, Canada and is part of the Peel District School Board. In September 2008, BCSS had 1,775 students.

History
The first secondary school in Brampton opened in 1852 as Brampton High School with three students and its first principal A. Thompson. By 1888 it had an annual budget of $868.25. After a fire, the school building was reconstructed in 1977. Brampton Centennial Secondary School was built in 1967 — the Canadian Centennial year — to replace Brampton High School.

School shooting

On 28 May 1975 Michael Slobodian, a student at the school, brought two rifles to school with the intention of killing two particular teachers and himself. He opened fire, killing one of the teachers and one student, and wounding 13 students before shooting and killing himself. This was only the second school shooting in Canadian history.

Athletics

Brampton Centennial has many athletics programs which are collectively known by students as "Buckland." The schools sports programs include Football, basketball, curling, swimming, track and field, volleyball, wrestling, hockey, baseball, Fast Pitch, cricket, badminton, lacrosse, rugby and soccer.

Recent athletic achievements
Senior Boys Basketball ROPSSAA Tier 1 Champions (2019)
Varsity Boys Rugby ROPSSAA Tier 2 Champions (2018)
Junior Boys Volleyball ROPSSAA Tier 2 Champions (2018)
Junior Boys Basketball ROPSSAA TIER I Champions (2017)
Senior Boys Cricket ROPSSAA Participants (2011)
Junior Boys Basketball ROPSSAA TIER I Champions (2011)
Senior Boys Basketball TIER II silver medal at ROPSSAA (2009)
Girls Overall First in ROPSSAA Wrestling (2008)
Boys Overall third in ROPSSAA Wrestling (2008)
Girls Lacrosse ROPSSAA Silver Medalists (2008)
Wrestling team placed second overall in ROPSSAA (2007-2008)
Silver in ROPSSAA Championship Hockey (2007)
ROPSSA silver curling boys (2006-2007)
OFSSAA silver mixed curling (2006)
Wrestling team won ROPSSAA Championship (2006)
Two consecutive undefeated Junior Boys Rugby regular seasons (2005-2007)
Reigning Varsity Boys Lacrosse Three-peat Champions (2004-2007)
Peel Secondary School Athletic Association Senior Football Champions (1995)

Alumni
Michel S. Beaulieu - historian, university professor, President of the Champlain Society, President of the Ontario Historical Society
Chris Cuthbert - TSN Sports Broadcaster
Wayne Middaugh - World and Canadian curling champion
Peter Corner - World and Canadian curling champion
Rick Nash - NHL player for the New York Rangers
Scott Thompson of The Kids in the Hall was a student at Centennial Secondary School
Scott Wedgewood - Goalie drafted by the New Jersey Devils in 2010
Ken Whillans - Former Mayor of Brampton
Julie White - Olympic high jumper
Adam Latchman - Youtuber

Ontario Human Rights Tribunal
Former Vice Principal Ranjit Khatkur of South Asian background alleged that her ethnic/racial background was the reason she was overlooked for promotion to principal despite fulfilling all requirements. She launched an Ontario Human Rights Tribunal alleging systematic discrimination in the Peel public board. It eventually culminated in allowing the Turner Consulting Group to release a Research Report on Hiring and Promotion at the Peel District School Board.

See also

List of high schools in Ontario

References

External links
Official web site
School Profile at the Peel District School Board web site
Profile at the Education Quality and Accountability Office (EQAO) web site
50th Reunion of Brampton Centennial Secondary School

Peel District School Board
High schools in Brampton
Educational institutions established in 1967
1967 establishments in Ontario